Maiva Drummond was an Australian actress of stage and radio, known for her part in the long-running ABC radio serial Blue Hills as Rose Bishop, and had appeared in the predecessor series The LawsonsBiography
Theatre
Drummond was born in Bathurst, New South Wales lived most of her young life in Hay. She first appeared in amateur productions of A Midsummer Night's Dream and The Boatswain's Mate in Sydney in 1927. By 1928 she was teaching elocution back in Hay and held a concert featuring her pupils as a fundraiser for the Parish Hall, where she later produced and performed in many fundraising entertainments. In 1934 she appeared in Heat Wave with the Little Theatre in Melbourne. The following year she played Florrie in Gregan McMahon's production of Sheppey. Also in the cast was her future husband, Paul O'Loughlin.

Radio
Her radio career began in Melbourne, appearing in radio plays on 3LO. She moved to Sydney in 1937 to take the role of Elsie in the serial As Ye Sow broadcast nationally, meanwhile appearing on stage from time to time, including J. C. Williamson's production of Personal Appearance in which she played a comedy role alongside Peter Finch.

In the 1940s she played Jean Lawson in the long-running serial The Lawsons''. To accommodate her pregnancy and early motherhood, Gwen Meredith wrote a train smash into the script.

Drummond and Queenie Ashton had the last lines of the last episode recorded 30 September 1976:
Rose: It's saying goodbye, Granny. I always feel it's sad to say goodbye.
Granny: Yes Rose, it certainly is this time . . . but we don't have to see people every day of the week to remember them in their surroundings. It isn't really so hard to say goodbye . . . to say goodbye . . . and God bless.

Personal life
She married Paul O'Loughlin, an RAAF bombardier and ABC radio producer, in Sydney in 1942.

References

External links 

 

20th-century Australian actresses
Australian radio actresses